Walnut Ridge is a train station in Walnut Ridge, Arkansas, United States, that is currently served by Amtrak, the national railroad passenger system. It was originally a Missouri Pacific Railroad station and has been listed on the National Register of Historic Places since 1992.

History
The Missouri-Pacific Railroad ended service on its crack Texas Eagle on April 30, 1971, one day before Amtrak took over passenger services. In March 1974, Amtrak's Inter-American was extended from Fort Worth to St. Louis, restoring passenger service to the Missouri-Pacific Railroad's main line. On September 15, 1974, stops were added at the former Missouri-Pacific stations in Walnut Ridge and Newport. The Inter-American was replaced by the Eagle in 1981, which in turn was renamed as the Texas Eagle in 1988.

The depot was restored in 1995 with funding made available through the Arkansas Highway and Transportation Department and the Walnut Ridge Area Chamber of Commerce.

See also

List of Amtrak stations
National Register of Historic Places listings in Lawrence County, Arkansas

References

External links

Walnut Ridge, AR from Amtrak's TexasEagle.com
Walnut Ridge Amtrak Station (USA Rail Guide—TrainWeb.org)

Amtrak stations in Arkansas
Walnut Ridge, Arkansas
Railway stations on the National Register of Historic Places in Arkansas
Transportation in Lawrence County, Arkansas
Railway stations in the United States opened in 1908
National Register of Historic Places in Lawrence County, Arkansas
1908 establishments in Arkansas